Joseph Ferdinand Leopold of Bavaria (28 October 1692 – 6 February 1699) was the son of Maximilian II Emanuel, Elector of Bavaria (1679–1705, 1714–1726) and his first wife, Maria Antonia of Austria, daughter of Leopold I, Holy Roman Emperor, maternal granddaughter of King Philip IV of Spain.

Youth
Prince Joseph Ferdinand was born in Vienna on October 28, 1692, son of Duke Maximilian II Emanuel, Elector of Bavaria, and Archduchess Maria Antonia, daughter of Emperor Leopold I. He was, therefore, a great-grandson of Philip IV of Spain and a great-nephew of Charles II of Spain.

His mother died soon after his birth and he was left in the charge of his grandfather, Holy Roman Emperor Leopold I, as his father was in Brussels, where he served as governor of the Spanish Netherlands from March 1692. On May 2, 1693, Josef Ferdinand, accompanied by the former household of his mother, left Vienna for Munich, where he arrived on 2 or 3 June.

Heir of Charles II
Charles II's mother, Mariana of Austria, supported the candidacy of Maximilian Emmanuel, Elector of Bavaria, husband of her granddaughter Maria Antonia, and then that of Joseph Ferdinand (who was descended from the first Habsburg king in Spain, Philip I of Castile, thirty-one different ways). The Bavarian claim found many supporters among the nobles unhappy with the German clique of Mariana of Neuburg, Charles II's wife. On her deathbed, Emperor Leopold I had forced his daughter, Maria Antonia (the Electoral Prince's mother), to waive her inheritance rights in order to limit the powers of the newborn.

From these facts began a war between the two Marianas, the Queen Mother and Consort. The period between 1693 and 1696 (the year of the death of the Queen Mother) were years of constant political tension and political intrigue. The German clique formed around the Queen earned the hatred of the nobility. According to rumors circulated by the court, there was a plot which intended to lock up the Queen and bring Prince Joseph Ferdinand to Madrid, to be placed on the throne under the regency of the Queen Mother and his chief supporters.

The Queen Mother died on May 16, 1696. Her triumph was a posthumously signed will in which her son, Charles II, decreed in September 1696 his nephew Joseph Ferdinand of Bavaria, the heir to the monarchy. In the State Council of June 13, 1696, an intermediate position between the French and the imperial candidates for succession, in which Joseph Ferdinand was featured as the candidate best suited to the succession. In the end Charles wrote a will in which he declared the Electoral Prince to be his successor.

In September of that year Charles II had a severe relapse so the State Council resolved to force the King to sign the will in June. The King had a relapse on October 9, so that the State Council reconvened. At that meeting the Bavarian party got the will pushed through and Cardinal Portocarrero forced King Charles II to sign the testament in favor of the Electoral Prince of Bavaria: only the Admiral of Castile, the Constable and three members supported the Archduke Charles.

During the minority of Joseph Ferdinand, the regency instituted by the will appointed a governing board which supported Mariana of Austria during the minority of Charles II, headed by Cardinal Portocarrero, the Regent-Governor who would have very broad powers.

The stubborn defence of the nomination by the pro-Bavarian Cardinal Portocarrero, become a key policy of the last years of the reign of Charles II. The Cardinal prevented Charles II from succumbing to the influence of his wife and possibly summoning a Parliament to modify the testament.

In early 1698 Portocarrero presented the king with a new report of the State Council in favor of the Bavarian Succession. The monarch wanted to consult with Pope Innocent XII, who was also allegedly pro-Bavarian. It was in such circumstances that the King reaffirmed his Testament:

Mariana of Neuburg reacted against the Testament by having Catalonia seized, and German troops were sent to Toledo and Madrid, while her cousin, Prince George of Hesse-Darmstadt prepared to leave Barcelona with his troops. The French Ambassador to Madrid, Henri, duc d’Harcourt, met 6000 soldiers who had arrived in Madrid ready to intervene.

Max Emanuel of Bavaria sent for his son to come to Brussels with the intention that the States of Flanders would swear an oath on the death of Charles II. Joseph Ferdinand came to the Flemish capital on 23 May 1698. Meanwhile, Louis XIV agreed in The Hague with the maritime powers on the distribution of the Spanish Crown's lands on the death of Charles II: the treaty was signed with England on September 8 and the United Provinces on 11 October. It provided that the peninsular kingdoms, with the exception of Guipúzcoa, plus the Indies would go to Joseph Ferdinand (section 5), the Archduke Charles would receive the Milanese (article 6), while Louis, Dauphin of France would remain in possession of the kingdoms of Naples and Sicily, as well as the State of Presidi and the Marquisate of Finale.

Death
However, Joseph Ferdinand died on February 3, 1699, at the age of six, leaving the Spanish Succession uncertain again. His death was quite sudden, Joseph Ferdinand being gripped with seizures, vomiting and prolonged loss of consciousness. He was rumoured to have been poisoned, but nothing has been proven. He is buried in Brussels. With him the furthest line of descent possible from the marriage of Philip IV of Spain and his second wife and niece Mariana of Austria ended.

References

Bavaria, Joseph Ferdinand of
Electoral Princes of Bavaria
Heirs apparent who never acceded
Joseph Ferdinand of Bavaria
Bavaria, Duke Joseph Ferdinand of
Bavaria, Duke Joseph Ferdinand of
Royalty and nobility who died as children
Sons of monarchs
Non-inheriting heirs presumptive